The super lightweight (or light welterweight) division in MMA sits between the lightweight division and the welterweight division. It was approved by the Association of Boxing Commissions on July 26, 2017.

Some UFC fighters, including Ben Askren, Kevin Lee, Dustin Poirier and Conor McGregor, have expressed interest in competing in a new UFC 165 lb division. However UFC president Dana White stated that there would never be a 165-pound division in the UFC.

Regional mixed martial arts promotion King of the Cage has implemented a 165 pound weight class and championship, though they refer to their 165 pound weight class as Light Welterweight.

Eagle Fighting Championship has introduced a 165 pound weight class at Eagle 46 where in the main event, Diego Sanchez and Kevin Lee had their Eagle FC debuts in this division. They refer to their 165 pound weight class as Super Lightweight and moved their Welterweight division from 170 pounds to 175 pounds.

References

Mixed martial arts weight classes